The year 1906 in film involved some significant events.



Events
December 26 – The world's first feature film, The Story of the Kelly Gang, is released.
 Carl Laemmle opens one of the first movie theaters in Chicago.

Films released in 1906

A
 Aladdin and His Wonder Lamp (Aladin ou la lampe merveilleuse), directed by Albert Capellani, based on the Middle-Eastern folk tale – (France)
 The Automobile Thieves, directed by J. Stuart Blackton – (US)

D
 Dream of a Rarebit Fiend, directed by Edwin S. Porter – (US)

G
 The Gans-Nelson Contest, starring Joe Gans and Battling Nelson – (US)

H
 The Hilarious Posters (Les Affiches en goguette), directed by Georges Méliès – (France)
 The House of Ghosts (La Maison ensorcelée), directed by Segundo de Chomón – (France)
 Humorous Phases of Funny Faces, directed by J. Stuart Blackton – (US)

L
 Life of a Cowboy, directed by Edwin S. Porter – (US)
 A Lively Quarter-Day, directed by J. H. Martin – (GB)

M
 The Magic Roses (Les Roses magique), directed by Segundo de Chomón – (France)
 Mephisto's Son (Le Fils du Diable), directed by Charles-Lucien Lépine – (France)
 The Merry Frolics of Satan (Les Quat'Cents Farces du Diable), directed by Georges Méliès – (France)
 The Mysterious Retort (L'Alchimiste Parafaragaramus ou la Cornue infernale), directed by Georges Méliès – (France)

Q
 The '?' Motorist, directed by Walter R. Booth – (GB)

R
 The Rajah's Casket (L'есrin du rajah), directed by Gaston Velle – (France)

S
 San Francisco: Aftermath of Earthquake, directed by Robert K. Bonine – (US)
 The Scheming Gambler's Paradise (Le Tripot clandestin), directed by Georges Méliès – (France)
 A Spiritualistic Meeting (Le Fantôme d'Alger) (lost), directed by Georges Méliès – (France)
 The Story of the Kelly Gang (incomplete), directed by Charles Tait – (Australia)

T
 Three American Beauties, directed by Edwin S. Porter and Wallace McCutcheon Sr. – (US)
 A Trip Down Market Street, directed by the Miles Brothers – (US)

V
 A Visit to Peek Frean and Co.'s Biscuit Works – (GB)

W
 Whitsuntide Fair at Preston, produced by Mitchell and Kenyon – (GB)
 A Winter Straw Ride, directed by Edwin S. Porter – (US)
 The Witch (La Fée Carabosse ou le Poignard fatal), directed by Georges Méliès – (France)

Births

Deaths
 May 23 – Henrik Ibsen, author (born 1828)
 July 18 – Gaynor Rowlands, (lantern actress) (born 1883)

Debuts
 Florence Lawrence – The Automobile Thieves (short)
 Gabrielle Robinne – The Troubadour (short)

External links

References

 
Film by year